James Naanman Daman (April 10, 1956 – January 12, 2015) was a Roman Catholic bishop.

James Naanman Daman was born on April 10, 1956, in Miket, Nigeria. Other sources say he was born in Kwa, Nigeria. He was ordained to the priesthood in 1982 by Pope John Paul II. Daman was named bishop of the Diocese of Jalingo, Nigeria, in 2000 and was named the first bishop of the Diocese of Shendam in 2007. He died in his sleep in his residence on January 12, 2015.

References 

1956 births
2015 deaths
21st-century Roman Catholic bishops in Nigeria
Roman Catholic bishops of Jalingo
Roman Catholic bishops of Shendam